Hong Kong Dragon Airlines Limited, operated as Cathay Dragon (previously as Dragonair), was an international airline headquartered in Hong Kong SAR, China, with its corporate headquarters, Dragonair House, and main hub at Hong Kong International Airport.

Cathay Dragon was a wholly owned subsidiary and the regional wing of Cathay Pacific, concentrating on destinations in the People's Republic of China and within Asia, while its parent operates a worldwide network to destinations in the Asia-Pacific, Europe, North America and Africa.

Destinations 
Initially, Dragonair operated its passenger services only as regular charter flights; these were passenger flights that were operated by the airline on a programme basis similar to scheduled flights, but were not part of the air services agreement between their respective countries. The airline was granted scheduled services rights in 1990.

The destination list shows airports that were served by Cathay Dragon as part of its regular charter and scheduled passenger services at the time of its cessation of operations in October 2020, as well as scheduled services of its former cargo division.

References

External links

Dragonair Cargo 
Dragonair destinations
Cathay Pacific and Dragonair Cargo network

Hong Kong transport-related lists
Lists of airline destinations
Oneworld affiliate destinations